Umberto Poli (born 27 August 1996) is an Italian cyclist, who currently rides for UCI ProTeam .

Career
He competed at the 2017 Milan–San Remo where he finished 192nd, 17 minutes and 22 seconds behind the winner.  He was the youngest rider in the race at 20 years old and did not know he was riding in the race until the Wednesday before.  He initially formed part of the breakaway, but fell off at Capo Berta.

References

External links

Cycling Quotient: Umberto Poli

Team Novo Nordisk: Umberto Poli

Italian male cyclists
Living people
1996 births
Sportspeople from Verona
Cyclists from the Province of Verona
People with type 1 diabetes